The Battle of Svistov was a battle of the Russo-Turkish War of 1877–1878. It was fought between the Ottoman Empire and Imperial Russia on 26 June 1877. It occurred when Russian general Mikhail Ivanovich Dragomirov crossed the Danube River in a fleet of small boats and attacked the Turkish fortress. The next day, Mikhail Skobelev attacked, forcing the Turkish garrison to surrender. In result, the Russian military became ready to attack Nikopol.

References

George Bruce. Harbottle's Dictionary of Battles. (Van Nostrand Reinhold, 1981).

Svistov
Svistov
Svistov
Svishtov
1877 in Bulgaria
Svistov
Svistov
History of Veliko Tarnovo Province
June 1877 events